Santa Fe (IPA: [sɐntɐ 'fɛ]), officially the Municipality of Santa Fe, is a 5th class municipality in the province of Leyte, Philippines. According to the 2020 census, it has a population of 22,102 people.

History
About thirty years ago, Santa Fe was just one of the biggest barrios of Palo, Leyte. In 1948, Juan R. Perez, a native of this barrio, was a private secretary. Inspired and prompted by Melquiades Almen, Julian Dagami, Jose Catada, Antonio Evalo, Eulogio Navarra and Maximo Postreto, all civic leaders and with the consent of Mayor Generoso Alvarado of Palo, House Bill No. 1918 was drafted and sponsored on May 6, 1948, on the floor of the House of Representatives by Congressman Perez, creating Santa Fe a town. At first there was strong opposition from the residents of Palo as Santa Fe and other affected barrios were the main source of income for the town but the oppositionist were silenced by the budding leaders of Santa Fe. The bill was finally approved by the lower house and the Senate under the leadership of Senator Jose Avelino. However, politics intervened. While the bill was waiting for the signature of President Elpidio Quirino, there was a split of the party in power.

Although President Quirino was the logical candidate for election, many leaders believed that Senate President Jose Avelino was the apparent successor to the presidency. Don Pio Pedrosa, then Secretary of Finance in the Cabinet of President Quirino was commissioned to sound out the political sentiments of the people of Santa Fe in that presidential election. His objective in visiting Santa Fe was to unite the leaders there so that it would be easy for him to secure approval of the bill pending the signature of President Quirino converting Santa Fe into a town. Those supporting the administration met Sec. Pedrosa in the old Martinez residence. Atty. Carlos Martinez was the leader of this group. Those supporting Senate President Jose Avelino, under the leadership of the private secretary of Congressman Juan Perez met Sec. Pedrosa in the public victory in the entire country. The bill creating Santa Fe into a town was vetoed. However, the yearnings, dreams and aspirations of this ambitious barrio was not to be denied for long. Smarting from the bitter lesson of disunity, fresh efforts were exerted to renew the campaign with more enthusiasm to convince the powers that Santa Fe should be made a free and independent town from Palo, in the name of progress. At this point, the warring political factions of the town were strongly united and determined to overcome all obstacles along the way. Under the guidance of Santa Ana, the patroness of this barrio, Don Pio Pedrosa forgave those who did not follow him in that presidential election. Upon his strong recommendation, President Quirino, by Executive Order No. 277 dated October 10, 1949, created Santa Fe, together with Tunga and Julita as new towns of Leyte.

Santa Fe was then born as a free and independent town by presidential fiat and notably legislative action. On the eve of its traditional town fiesta, the residents under the leadership of Mayor Iluminado Martinez, one of the first councilors of Santa Fe in 1949 and dynamic parish priest Rev. Father Antonio Adre, in grateful remembrance and recognition, saluted the efforts of those who led in making Santa Fe a town out of several barrios of Palo. Its fertile fields and valleys abound with corn, camote and other root crops, while its rivers Kasili-on and Maslog are rich with fish, adequate in quantity to give food and sustenance to its ever-increasing population. The BANCOM projects in its northern periphery promises to be the rice granary of the town. Today there are 20 barangays in Santa Fe with an area of 5,567 hectares irrigated and planted with rice.

Geography

Barangays
Santa Fe is politically subdivided into 20 barangays.

Climate

Demographics

Economy

Education
There are a total of 17 elementary schools and 2 high schools in Santa Fe Leyte

Elementary/Grade School

High School/Secondary Schools
 Santa Fe National High School
 Santa Fe Stand-alone Senior High School

References

External links
 [ Philippine Standard Geographic Code]
Philippine Census Information
Local Governance Performance Management System

Municipalities of Leyte (province)
Establishments by Philippine executive order